The 1888 United States presidential election in Colorado took place on November 6, 1888, as part of the 1888 United States presidential election. Voters chose three representatives, or electors to the Electoral College, who voted for president and vice president.

Colorado voted for the Republican nominee, Benjamin Harrison, over the Democratic nominee, incumbent President Grover Cleveland. Harrison won the state by a margin of 14.38 points.

With 55.22 percent of the popular vote, Colorado proved to be Harrison's fifth strongest victory in terms of percentage in the popular vote after Vermont, Nevada, Maine and Kansas. This was nonetheless the last election of an era when Colorado had, like the Plains States to its east, been solidly Republican, with that party continuously controlling the legislature and holding the governorship for five of seven terms. Widespread criticism of the national party for its monetary policy in a state that was the major producer of silver in the United States and was resentful of the Northeast – where the Republican Party’s power base was located – would turn the state into a Populist stronghold and then a Democratic-leaning state until after World War I.

Results

Results by county

References

Colorado
1888
1888 Colorado elections